T95 or T-95 may be:

Military

Tanks

Russia 
 T-95, a Russian prototype main battle tank

America 
 T95 Gun Motor Carriage, a U.S. prototype self-propelled gun of World War II, renamed T28 Super Heavy Tank in 1946
 T95 Medium Tank, a series of American prototype tanks developed from 1955 to 1959

Rifle 
 Type 95, a Chinese assault rifle

Other 
 KICT-FM, a rock radio station in Wichita, Kansas that uses the name T-95

See also

 
 
 95 (disambiguation)
 Type 95 (disambiguation)